Marinicella sediminis is a Gram-negative, aerobic, non-spore-forming, rod-shaped, heterotrophic and non-motile bacterium from the genus of Marinicella which has been isolated from sediments from the coast of Weihai in China.

References

Alteromonadales
Bacteria described in 2018